"Pauvre Martin" ("Poor Martin") is a 1953 song by the French singer Georges Brassens. It first appeared on his album, Le Vent.

In this sad and melancholic song, inspired by the work of François Villon, Brassens evokes the situation of agricultural workers and small landowners who toil on small farms and who derive a living wage, modestly, without complaint. The song was covered by Barbara in 1969.

External links
 George Brassens-Pauvre Martin
 George Brassens-Pauvre Martin

French songs
Fictional farmers
Fictional French people
1953 songs
Georges Brassens songs
Songs written by Georges Brassens
Songs about poverty